Sergio Casal and Emilio Sánchez successfully defended their title, by defeating Jorge Lozano and Todd Witsken 7–6(7–4), 7–6(7–4) in the final.

Seeds

Draw

Draw

References

External links
 Official results archive (ATP)
 Official results archive (ITF)

Citibank Open Doubles
Citibank Open Doubles